The following outline is provided as an overview of and topical guide to public transport:

Public transport – transport of passengers by group travel systems available for use by the general public, typically managed on a schedule, operated on established routes, and that charge a posted fee for each trip. Public transport modes include city buses, trolleybuses, trams (or light rail) and passenger trains, rapid transit (metro/subway/underground, etc.) and ferries. Public transport between cities is dominated by airlines, coaches, and intercity rail.

What type of thing is public transport? 

Public transport can be described as all of the following:

 Technology – making, usage, and knowledge of tools, machines, techniques, crafts, systems or methods of organization in order to solve a problem or perform a specific function. It can also refer to the collection of such tools, machinery, and procedures.
 Transport – the movement of humans, animals and goods from one location to another.

Types of public transport

Types of public transport, by mode 
 Airline
 Bush airplane
 Bus
 Public transport bus service
 Bus rapid transit
 Guided bus
 Public light bus
 Shuttle bus
 Transit bus
 Trolleybus
 Intercity bus service
 Charabanc
 Express bus
 Open top bus
 Rail replacement bus
 Rail transport – means of conveyance of passengers and goods by way of wheeled vehicles running on rail tracks consisting of steel rails installed on sleepers/ties and ballast.
 Intercity rail
 High-speed rail
 Regional rail
 Urban rail transit
 Commuter rail
 Rapid transit
 Rubber-tyred metro
 Light metro
 Light rail
 Interurban
 Tram-train
 Street running
 Tram
 Cable car (railway)
 Funicular
 Heavy rail
 Heritage railway
 Heritage streetcar
 Horsecar
 Medium-capacity rail system
 Monorail
 Aerial tramway
 Gondola lift
 Passenger ship
 Ferry
 Cable ferry
 Hovercraft
 Hydrofoil
 Ocean liner
 Water taxi

Other forms of publicly available transport 

 Free public transport
 Personal public transport
 Personal rapid transit - Proposed form of public transport featuring small automated vehicles operating on a network of specially built guideways.

Vehicles for hire 
 Auto rickshaw - A motorized development of the traditional rickshaw.
 Boda-boda - Bicycle & motorcycle taxis commonly found in East Africa.
 Cycle rickshaw - A local means of transport that are human-powered by pedaling
 Gondola - A traditional, flat-bottomed Venetian rowing boat, well suited to the conditions of the Venetian lagoon.
 Hackney carriage - A carriage or automobile for hire.
 Limousine -  A luxury sedan or saloon car driven by a chauffeur and with a partition between the driver and the passenger compartment.
 Motorcycle taxi - A taxi that typically carries one passenger, who rides as the pillion behind the motorcycle operator. 
 Paratransit -  Special transportation services for people with disabilities, often provided as a supplement to fixed-route bus and rail systems by public transit agencies.
 Pulled rickshaw - A mode of human-powered transport by which a runner draws a two-wheeled cart which seats one or two people.
 Share taxi - Vehicles for hire that are typically smaller than buses and usually take passengers on a fixed or semi-fixed route without timetables, but instead departing when all seats are filled. 
 Taxicab - A car used by a single passenger or small group of passengers, often for a non-shared ride.
 Car jockey
 Flexible carpooling
 Ridesharing company
 Slugging
 Vanpool

History of public transport 

History of public transport

General public transport concepts 
 Transport hub
 Intermodal passenger transport
 Public transport timetable
 Headway
 Farebox recovery ratio
 Passenger load factor
 Patronage (transport)
 Ticket (admission)
 Airline ticket
 Train ticket
 Transit pass
 Proof-of-payment
 Free public transport
 Free travel pass
 Integrated ticketing
 Boarding (transport)
 Boarding pass
 Conductor (rail)
 Subsidy
 Public transport security
 Transit police
 Sustainable transport
 Public transport planning
 Transport-oriented development

Public transport organizations 
 Urban transit advocacy organizations
 Transit watchdog
 Bus Riders Union (Los Angeles)
 Bus Riders Union (Vancouver)
 Campaign for Better Transport (New Zealand)
 Global Alliance for EcoMobility
 Institute for Transportation and Development Policy
 International Association of Public Transport
 Straphangers Campaign
 T Rider's Union
 Transport Action Canada
 Tri-State Transportation Campaign
 TRU Winnipeg
 TTCriders

Persons influential in public transport 
Harry Beck (4 June 1902 - 18 September 1974), was the creator of the topological London Underground map that has been emulated for many railway and metro maps around the world.
Richard Trevithick (13 April 1771 - 22 April 1833), was the engineer who built the first railway steam locomotive that was demonstrated at Penydarren ironworks in South Wales on 21 February 1804. The steam locomotive went on to reduce travel times between towns and cities and was one of the key inventions of the Industrial Revolution.
George Bradshaw (29 July 1800 - 6 September 1853), was the producer of the first compilation of railway timetables in Bradshaw's Guide in 1839.
John Stephenson (1809 -1893), was the inventor of the first streetcar (named "John Mason") to run on rails in the USA. It was pulled by horses and opened on the 26 November 1832.
Robert Davidson (1804 - 1894), was a Scottish inventor and builder of the first known electric locomotive. Named Galvani, it was tested on the Edinburgh and Glasgow Railway in September 1842 and had a top speed of 4mph.
Werner von Siemens (13 December 1816 - 6 December 1892), was the father of the trolleybus and the creator of the world's first electric tram line, the Gross-Lichterfelde Tramway.
Hideo Shima (20 May 1901 - 18 March 1998), was the engineer of the Shinkansen bullet train.

See also 

 List of metro systems
 List of tram and light rail transit systems

External links 

 
Public transport
Wikipedia outlines
Technology-related lists